Seden Gürel (born 12 September 1965) is a Turkish singer.

She studied at Bahariye Middle school and Kadıköy Anatolian High School. Later she studied architecture at Istanbul Technical University. She made her first recording at the age of 14. She has released seven albums in total.

She was married to the musician, Aykut Gürel for 23 years until their divorce in 2012. On 20 July 2014, she married lawyer Macit Koçer.

Albums 
 Bir Yudum Sevgi (1992)
 Aklımı Çelme (1994)
 Muhtemelen (1996)
 Hesaplaşma (2002)
 Bir Kadın Şarkı Söylüyor (2004)
 Maia (Duet with Kerem Cem) (2005)
 Bir Nefes (2008)
 Seden Eurovision'da (2020)

References

External links 
Official website

1965 births
Living people
Musicians from Ankara
Turkish women singers
Turkish pop singers
Kadıköy Anadolu Lisesi alumni